Kinyongia carpenteri, commonly called Carpenter's chameleon or the helmeted chameleon, is a species of chameleon, a lizard in the family Chamaeleonidae. The species is native to central Africa.

Geographic range
K. carpenteri has a geographic range limited to the mountain highlands on the border between Uganda and the Democratic Republic of the Congo.

Habitat

Reproduction
K. carpenteri is oviparous.

Etymology
The specific name, carpenteri, honors the type specimen's collector, British physician and entomologist Geoffrey Douglas Hale Carpenter.

Taxonomy
Originally named in the genus Chamaeleo, the species C. carpenteri was moved into the genus Bradypodion prior to its current classification. With the move into the genus Kinyongia, the masculine ending to the specific epithets of other species in the genus needed to be modified to match the feminine generic name.

References

Further reading
Spawls S, Howell K, Hinkel H, Menegon M (2018). Field Guide to East African Reptiles, Second Edition. London: Bloomsbury Natural History. 624 pp. . (Kinyongia carpenteri, p. 267).

Kinyongia
Lizards of Africa
Reptiles described in 1929
Taxa named by Hampton Wildman Parker
Reptiles of the Democratic Republic of the Congo